Sicincin Station (SCN, formerly Sitjintjin Station) is a railway station located in Sicincin, 2x11 Enam Lingkung, Padang Pariaman Regency. The station, which is located at an altitude of +89 m, is included in the Regional Division II West Sumatra.

To support railbus transportation that runs on the – railway segment, this station together with the Kayu Tanam Station have undergone a complete overhaul.

Only one train service that stop at this station, namely the Lembah Anai railbus, for Kayu Tanam and the destination for Lubuk Alung, was inaugurated on 1 November 2016.

Services 
There is only one passenger train journey, namely Lembah Anai railbus towards  and towards Minangkabau.

References

External links 

Padang Pariaman Regency
Railway stations in West Sumatra